A power shuttle is an additional unit used in transmissions and is generally used in agricultural tractors.  While the vehicle is moving forwards, the driver can pull a lever that makes it stop and go backwards at the same speed. Power Shuttles are also known under various trade names including Power Reverser

In forward/reverse position of the F-R lever, the pressure is built in the system due to flow to wet clutch. During, the pressure rise,F-R clutch is in energized condition which makes the vehicle to move forward/Reverse direction. Flow to tank line is blocked during the flow to F/R clutch.

Power shuttle are incorporated in transmissions in three forms: counter-shaft, full planetary (power shifts), and CVT transmissions.

Counter shaft transmissions
In this case generally forward reverse synchronizers are replaced by the multi-plate friction clutches. Typically the multi-plate clutches are arranged on the main shaft or on the counter shaft. The forward reverse section of the gear box is generally located in the forward section as close to the engine as possible. This is beneficial to the forward reverse control elements as they are not subjected to the high relative torque. The challenge involved in providing this feature in the existing transmissions is the complex shaft arrangement. This problem arises due to the limitation of centre distance between the two shafts and fixed axial dimensions due to the vehicle size limitations.

Full planetary (power shift)
In this type of transmissions the planetary action is used for providing reverse or forward action to the gear box.

CVT/IVT
Here the automatic nature of the gear box takes care of the direction change by either engaging planetary sets or by engaging multi-plate clutches or by some other means.
Features of power shuttle transmissions.

Power shuttle transmissions were invented for mining and earth moving applications. The needs in the areas were:
Quick shuttle response
Left hand shuttle lever (so that right hand is free for loader joystick)
Reducing driver fatigue.

References
 http://www.landini.com/pdf/05_RX2_PLT_8P.pdf

Mechanical power transmission